Euthemis minor is a plant in the family Ochnaceae. The specific epithet  is from the Latin meaning "small", referring to the species' smaller size when compared with E. leucocarpa.

Description
The flowers are pinkish when fresh.

Distribution and habitat
Euthemis minor grows naturally in Sumatra, Peninsular Malaysia and Borneo. Its habitat is lowland to submontane forests, including kerangas forests, from sea-level to  altitude.

References

Ochnaceae
Flora of Sumatra
Flora of Peninsular Malaysia
Flora of Borneo
Taxonomy articles created by Polbot